Zürich HB SZU railway station is a railway station in the municipality of Zürich, in the Swiss canton of Zürich. It is underneath and physically connected to the Zürich Hauptbahnhof, Zürich's primary train station, although they do not share any tracks. The station is the terminus of the standard gauge Sihltal and Uetliberg railway lines of the Sihltal Zürich Uetliberg Bahn.

Services
 the following services stop at Zürich HB SZU:

 Zürich S-Bahn:

References

External links

Hauptbahnhof
 HB SZU
Sihl
Railway stations located underground
Sihltal Zürich Uetliberg Bahn stations
Railway stations in Switzerland opened in 1990